The Udyoga Parva, or the Book of Effort, is the fifth of eighteen books of the Indian Epic Mahabharata. Udyoga Parva traditionally has 10 parts and 199 chapters. The critical edition of Sabha Parva has 12 parts and 197 chapters.

Udyoga Parva describes the period immediately after the exile of Pandavas had ended. The Pandavas return, demand their half of the kingdom. The Kauravas refuse. The book includes the effort for peace that fails, followed by the effort to prepare for the great war—the Kurukshetra War.

Vidura Niti, a theory of leadership as propounded by Vidura, is embedded in Udyoga Parva (Chapters 33–40). The Sanatsujatiya, a text commented upon by Adi Shankara, is contained within the Udyoga Parva (Chapters 41–46).

Structure and chapters
This Parva (book) traditionally has 10 sub-parvas (parts or little books) and 199 adhyayas (sections, chapters). The following are the sub-parvas:

 1. Sainyodyoga Parva (Chapters: 1–19)
 The 13th year of exile is over. Kings assemble in king Virata's court to mark the marriage of his daughter to Arjuna's son Abhimanyu. Krishna gives a speech to gathered kings that Pandavas must now return to their kingdom, Kauravas must return the kingdom they got from Pandavas for 13 years after a game of dice. Krishna speculates that Kauravas may refuse the return, may use military against Yudhishthira personally visits and makes the demand, or may be willing to a peaceful transfer. The intentions of the other side are unknown, suggests Krishna, so they should send a capable ambassador to understand the intentions of Kauravas and arrange a peaceful transfer.

 Satyaki reminds the gathered kings that the Kauravas got the kingdom by trick and evil, that evil people do not change. The proposed peaceful diplomacy is ridiculous, claims Satyaki, because peace can never be negotiated from a position of weakness. Only the strong who have the power and means to destroy their opponent, get a fair and just deal during peace negotiations. Satyaki recommends Pandavas should establish a visibly strong army, and slay all opponents. Drupada suggests despatching envoys to other virtuous and good kingdoms to build military alliance for Pandavas. Krishna approves. Envoys spread out. Kings and Krishna return to their homes. In parallel, Duryodhana on learning Pandavas intentions started building their alliances for war, to weaken Pandavas to a point that they do not even ask back their kingdom. Both Pandavas and Kauravas meet Krishna in Dwaraka, for their military preparations, but with morally opposite stands. Krishna ask Arjuna to choose either his army or he himself alone, resolved not to fight on the field. Arjuna chooses Krishna on his side. Duryodhana, in contrast, gets the Krishna's army to serve him. Krishna decides and promises to drive Arjuna's chariot if war becomes necessary. Duryodhana then went to the son of Rohini of great strength, and approaching him, explained him his reasons. Balarama refused to take part in battle as his affection for both sides. Shalya on being serviced and asked by Duryodhana as a boon, joins Kauravas side, then meets Yudhishthira. On learning Shalya being tricked, Yudhishthira asked him a favor that he will be chosen as Karna's charioteer during the war for sure in future, and compared his riding skills to Krishna. For their good, and protection of Arjuna, he must despirit Karna, by recounting the praises of Arjuna, so that victory can be achieved. Shalya promised him that he will speak to him in war in such contradictory words that will bereft him of pride and valour, and will be  easily slain by antagonist. Yudhishthira convinces Shalya that Kauravas are in error. Shalya agrees to explain Yudhishthira position to Duryodhana. Shalya leaves Pandavas camp to meet the Kaurava brothers.

 2. Sanjaya-yana Parva (Chapters: 20–32)
 Drupada's envoy reaches Kaurava brothers. He announces that Pandava brothers do not want war, they see war as something that ruins the world, all they want is an amicable settlement. He also informs the Dhritarashtra and Kuru family, that Yudhishthira seeks peace not out of weakness; they have seven Akshauhinis (large battalions). Drupada's envoy asks that Kaurava brothers give virtue and peace a chance, they give back that which should be returned. Bhishma responds that peace makes sense, but Karna on hearing Pandavas praises by that envoy in the court of Kaurava brothers, argues that Pandavas had become prideful of their might, so war is preferable. Dhritarashtra dismisses Drupada's envoy, promising to send Sanjaya to the Pandavas with a full response.

 Dhritarashtra summons Sanjaya, asks him to meet the Pandava brothers, but does not propose anything concrete about peaceful transfer of kingdom. Sanjaya meets Yudhishthira, urges peace, says war will cause losses to both sides, notes that if Pandavas kill Kauravas, it will make them miserable in victory. Yudhishthira says Pandavas do not want war, they want peace and prosperity. Pandavas had left their kingdom, Indraprastha during the exile, and Dhritarashtra must return the kingdom to him to make peace. Yudhishthira suggests to Sanjaya, in Chapter 31 of the parva, that he would accept a smaller kingdom if that would prevent war, further peace. Pandavas are ready for peace, and for war, claims Yudhishthira. Sanjaya returns to Dhritarashtra, urges him to take the path of peace, and in a brutally directly manner calls Dhritarashtra's approach towards Pandavas as sinful, suicidal and wrong.

 3. Prajagara Parva (Chapters: 33–40)
 Dhritarashtra summons Vidura for counsel, confesses Sanjaya's message have disordered his senses and caused him sleeplessness. Dhritarashtra asks for moral guidance and wisdom to lead his kingdom. Sage Vidura presents a discourse that is referred to as Vidura Niti. It describes the character and habits of wise men, how they combine virtuous life with prosperity. These adhyayas also describe the duties and actions of kings that enables a prosperous kingdom. After listening to Vidura, Dhritarashtra leans for peace and an accommodation of Pandava brothers; however, he says Duryodhana wants the opposite. Dhritarashtra claims his exertion may be in vain, destiny will do what it wants to.

 4. Sanatsujata Parva (Chapters: 41–46)
 Dhritarashtra continues in his suffering of anxiety and depression. He seeks more counsel from sage Vidura. The sage says he was born in Sudra class and has already counselled the king, perhaps the king should get second opinion from Sanat-Sujata who was born in Brahmin class. Vidura brings in sage Sanat-Sujata. Dhritarashtra asks him questions about eternal being, life after death and immortality. The response of Sanat-Sujata is another treatise called Sanatsujatiya (sometimes spelled Sanatsugatiya or Sanatsugâtîya). Scholars suggest Sanatsujatiya may have been a later insertion and addition into the original Epic. Adi Shankara commented on Sanatsujatiya, parts of the commentary too have been corrupted later by unknown individuals.

 Sanatsujatiya is a treatise on spirituality, inward contemplation, and marga (paths) to liberation and freedom. Sage Sanat-Sujata insists that rituals and Vedic ceremonies are not the path to emancipation, ignorance is living death, it is true knowledge of universal self that emancipates; he suggests that gods are ordinary creatures who have realized that self knowledge. This view of human beings as creatures of unlimited potential, mirrors those found in the Upanishads. Craving for wealth, desire for fame and longing for power suggests Sanatsugātiýa, is a cause for misery. Knowledge, virtue and faith in fruits of action are a cause of contentment. Dhritarashtra reminds Sanatsujata that Vedas declare sacrificial ceremonies remove sins and emancipate, why should men not engage in these practices. Sanat-Sujata replies that there are different paths, all with one goal. There is great inconsistency in interpretation of these paths. Ceremonies put undue importance to external forms, often ignore the inner self. Dhritarashtra asks if one can achieve emancipation in after life by renouncing everything but without virtue and right action. Sanatsujata replies that it is the inner state that matters, not outward manifestations. The hymns of Veda do not rescue people from sin they commit. Vice and knowledge can never dwell together. Sanatsujata then outlines twelve virtues one must live by and twelve vices to avoid, followed by three requirements for free, liberated life. In Chapter 44, Sanatsujata suggests knowledge is the only path to emancipation. In Chapter 45, Sanatsujata suggests virtuous attributes and actions are the path to gain that knowledge. After the counsel from Sanatsujata, Dhritarashtra retires for the night.

 5. Yanasandhi Parva (Chapters: 47–73)
 The Kaurava brothers assemble in the court to hear Sanjaya who has returned from Pandava brothers (see Sanjaya-yana Parva above). Sanjaya gives them message of Pandavas that either surrender to King Yuddhishthira, his kingdom or have war for Kuru destruction. Bhishma recommends peace and returning kingdom. Drona supports Bhishma. Karna objects. Bhishma ridicules Karna. Dhritarashtra inquires about Yudhisthria's military preparation. Sanjaya frankly criticizes Dhritarashtra for his vicious conduct towards Pandavas. Duryodhana getting provoked by Pandavas praises, reminds everyone of the warriors on their side, his own courage and readiness for war. Dhritarashtra asks about kingdoms who have allied to Pandavas. Sanjaya provides the details. Duryodhana interjects and provides a list of kingdoms who have allied with Kauravas and are ready for war. Dhritarashtra asks his son to accept peace and give back the kingdom to the Pandavas. Duryodhana mocks and refuses. Karna joins Duryodhana, mocks Pandavas and boasts his own warrior powers. Bhishma criticizes Karna again. Karna gets upset, promises to not fight till Bhishma is alive, and walks out of the court. Dhritarashtra again asks Duryodhana to choose peace. Duryodhana insists on war.

 6. Bhagavat-yana Parva (Chapters: 74–150)
 The Pandava brothers gather their counsels and Krishna. Yudhishthira opens the meeting with desire for peace. Krishna offers to be an envoy of peace to the Kauravas, with the counsel that Pandavas should prepare everything for war. Bhima, Arjuna, Nakula, Sahadeva and Satyaki take turns and express their views to Krishna, who comments to each. Krishna leaves for the court of the Kaurava brothers, and meets Rishis on the way. Dhritarashtra, learning of Krishna's arrival, makes great preparations to honour his welcome. Bhishma and Vidura applaud his act. Duryodhana himself makes preparations to please Krishna. Krishna arriving at Hastinapura first meets with Pritha, then Vidura and next day meets with Duryodhana in his chamber then set out for Kuru assembly hall disregarding all arrangement. Praising Pandavas kind acts and prowess and criticizing the Kurus' cowardess and inferiority he proposes peace between both parties. Dhritarashtra agrees with his proposal but Duryodhana casting his eyes on Radha's son laughingly ignores it. The great Rishis including Narada, Kanwa, and Rama tell him various stories for the change of his opinion but he from folly disregards their words and criticizes Krishna for his harsh words. All rebuke Duryodhana for his foolishness and advise to bind and give Duryodhana with his followers to the sons of Kunti. Duryodhana in anger walks out of court. Gandhari was called in the court. Vindictive Duryodhana was once more caused to re-enter the court. Gandhari called him wicked son of impure soul for his act. Duryodhana once more went out in anger. He made council with his followers to seize Krishna. Satyaki learns about it and informs Krishna. Krishna laughs at Duryodhana plan and uses his power of Divine illusion to show all of them his prowess and sets out of the court. The parva describes the symbolic story of Garuda to emphasize peace is better. Kanwa concurs with Krishna on peace. Sage Narada appears, who tells the story of Gavala, Yayati and Madhavi to explain to Duryodhana that his obstinate craving for war is wrong.  Dhritarashtra rebukes Duryodhana for his act.

 Krishna leaves the city of Kauravas, with Karna in a chariot. He tells Karna who Karna's real mother is, how he is a brother of the Pandavas, asks he should join his brothers and they will cheerfully accept him and will choose him the next king. Karna already knowing this, refuses, saying  obtaining him, Duryodhana provoked hostilities with Pandavas, and he cannot betray him since he was first to hold his hand for friendship and gave him kingdom, nor from affection he can leave Radha and Adiratha who cared him from childhood, for Kunti who abandoned him without thinking about his future and it will be englorious for him and his mother. He asked Krishna to conceal this for the present. Karna repents for his cruel acts in the past for pleasing Duryodhana. He said he knows he will die in the great war being on unrighteos side, but cannot leave his friend in distress, so will challenge Arjuna and will earn great merit or glory. Karna then hugs Krishna and returns to the city. Vidura meets with Partha. Kunti, Karna's real mother meets him during his prayers near Bhagiratha river, and they talk. She explains what happened when Karna was born, urges him to reconsider his position about the war. Surya confirms Kunti words. But though addressed by his mother and by also his father Surya himself, Karna heart did not yet waver, for he was firmly devoted to truth, he replies that she abandoned him as soon as he was born, involving risk to life itself, deprived him of Kshatriya rites, and addresses him today, desirous to do good to herself. He cannot change side now and frustrate that cherished hopes of Suyodhana, since it is too late for him. This is his chance to fight the Arjuna, earn fame and respect of the world. He promises that except Arjuna, her other sons, shall not be slain by him, even though he have the chance and the number of her sons will never be less than five, with five, either him or Arjuna, just like she pretended to have five sons before war. Kunti trembles with sorrow. Krishna reaches Pandavas camp and updates them of his effort at peace as an envoy, how he failed.

 7. Sainya-niryana Parva (Chapters: 151–159)

 War preparations accelerate. Yudhishthira seeks nominations for the commander in chief of allied forces behind Pandava brothers. Many names come forward, Krishna selects Dhristadyumna. The Pandava army marches for war to Kurukshetra. Duryodhana with Karna, Shakuni and Dussasana prepare for war. Bhishma is appointed by Duryodhana as commander in chief of armies behind Kaurava brothers. Venerable Bhishma said that Pandavas are dear to him, so he will not fight them openly and will, therefore, slay everyday at least 10,000 warriors. Both sides select chiefs for each of their Akshauhinis (battalions)—Pandavas have seven battalions, Kauravas have 11. Halayudha came there to meet Pandavas and his brother Krishna and expresses his views that he cannot pick side to fight, as both Bhima and Duryodhana are his disciples, and leaves for journey to the sacred waters. Rukmi (once fierce rival of Janarddana) came there into Pandavas camp and boasteth about his ability that he can slay all enemy commander. Arjuna smilingly boasteth that he does not have any ally in any of his fights and he single-handedly defeated everyone, so no need of his assistance. Rukmi then goes to Duryodhana and said same words, but that King, proud of his bravery, rejected him in the same way. So he also withdrew from the battle. Dhritarashtra meets Sanjaya, expresses his anxiety, wonders if the war is one of choice or destiny.

 8. Ulukabhigamana Parva (Chapters: 160–164)
 Duryodhana sends Uluka to Pandavas camped in Kurukshetra for war, with insulting messages to Yudhishthira, Bhima, Nakula, Sahadeva, Virata, Drupada, Dhananjaya, Sikhandin, Dhristadyumna and Vasudeva, as part of psychological warfare. The parva recites the fable of the cat and the mouse. Bhima gets angry at Uluka speech and addresses him harshly but was pacified by Arjuna. Uluka gives all the messages he was provided. Each person who listens to the message, replies. Yuddhishthira tells Uluka to return with the message he was given by all. Uluka returns to Kauravas camp, and delivers the messages from Pandava camp to him. Duryodhana and Karna arrays their troops to face the army of Pandavas. Yudhishthira moves his army. Dhristadyumna, the commander in chief of allied Pandava forces, studies the strengths of the enemy, appoints particular warriors in Pandavas side to focus on particular warriors on Kauravas side. 

 9. Rathatiratha-sankhyana Parva (Chapters: 165–172)
 Infighting erupts within the Kaurava side. Duryodhana asks for Bhishma views on both side warriors counted as rathas, and atirathas. Bhishma lists all 100 Kaurava brothers, and Sakuni as Rathas. Jayadratha equal to two rathas. Kritavarman, Salya, as Atirathas. Aswathaman, Drona, as Maharathas, with Ashwatthama as the supreme bowman who's arrows proceed in a continuous line touching each other and mocks Karna as only  being an ardharatha. Drona supports his words. Karna gets angry with Bhishma and criticizes him for making dissension among Kurus by indicating warrior ranks, according only to his own caprice. He vows he will not fight until he is laid down. The parva then describes rathas and atirathas on Pandava side, ready for war. King,  Shikhandin as Ratha. Bhimasena equal to eight Rathas. Nakula and Sahadeva are equal to Four Rathas.Dhrupada,Virata,Satyajit, Yudhishthira as Atiratha. Arjuna,Satyaki and Dhristadhyumna  as Maharatha. Bhishma said, he himself and their preceptor Drona are only warrior who can advance against Dhananjaya, no third car- warrior.

 10. Ambopakkyana Parva (Chapters: 173–199)
 This parva recites the story of Bhishma past exploits and a maiden named Amba, and how his emotional attachment means he can fight everyone but Sikhandin—a battalion commander in Pandavas side. Duryodhana then asks his commanders the time it will take each of them to annihilate the allied armies behind Pandavas. Bhishma said he can finish the slaughter in a month. Drona said smilingly that he is old, his energy and activity have both become weak, but like Bhishma, a month. Kripa estimates two months. Aswatthaman claims that he can annihilate the Pandava army in ten nights. Karna, however, with great Overconfidence, said he can achieve that feat in five days. Bhishma ridicules and mocks Karna. Yudhishthira, learning the news from spies, also asks the same question to Arjuna, the time he will take to annihilate the armies behind Kauravas. Arjuna said, with Vasudeva as his ally, he can, on his divine car, annihilate all mortals on earth, in the twinkling of the eye, using the terrible and mighty weapon he obtained from Mahadeva, if he provides and discharges it with enough energy. No  one knows this on the opposite side, but he is restricted to not using it for his own selfish reasons on human beings. The Pandava army marches to the battle front. The Kaurava army also marches to the battle front. Both armies face each other for war.

English translations

Udyoga Parva was composed in Sanskrit. Several translations of the book in English are available. Two translations from 19th century, now in public domain, are those by Kisari Mohan Ganguli and Manmatha Nath Dutt. The translations vary with each translator's interpretations.

Clay Sanskrit Library has published a 15 volume set of the Mahabharata which includes a translation of Udyoga Parva by Kathleen Garbutt. This translation is modern and uses an old manuscript of the Epic. The translation does not remove verses and chapters now widely believed to be spurious and smuggled into the Epic in 1st or 2nd millennium AD.

According to the Parvasangraha chapter of Adi Parva of one version of the Mahabharata, Vyasa had composed 186 sections in Udyoga Parva, with 6,698 slokas.

J. A. B. van Buitenen completed an annotated edition of Udyoga Parva, based on critically edited and least corrupted version of Mahabharata known in 1975. Debroy, in 2011, notes that updated critical edition of Udyoga Parva, with spurious and corrupted text removed, has 10 parts, 197 adhyayas (chapters) and 6,001 shlokas (verses). Debroy's translation of a critical edition of Udyoga Parva has been published in Volume 4 of his series.

Salient features
Udyoga Parva has several embedded treatises, such as a theory of leadership (Vidura Niti), a theory of dūta (diplomats, envoys) and a theory of just war.

Vidura Niti

In Chapters 33 through 40 of Udyoga Parva, also called Prajagara sub-parva, sage Vidura outlines things wise people and leaders should do, and things they should not. These are known as Vidura Niti. Some examples of his recommendations for leaders:

 He should wish for the prosperity of all, and should never set heart on inflicting misery on any group.
 He should pay attention to those who have fallen in distress and adversity. He should not ignore persistent sufferings of those that depend on him, even if the suffering is small.
 He should show compassion to all creatures, do what is good for all creatures rather than a select few.
 He should never impede the development and growth of agriculture and economic activity by anyone.
 He should be always be prepared to protect those that depend on him for their safety and security.
 He should be fair and accessible to his people. By means of virtue should he attain success, by means of virtue should he sustain it.
 He should consider the welfare of his people as his personal responsibility.
 He should encourage learning and transmission of knowledge.
 He should encourage profit and virtue. Prosperity depends on good deeds. Good deeds depend on prosperity.
 He should avoid friendship with the sinful. 
 He should never misuse wealth, use harsh speech nor inflict extreme or cruel punishments.
 He should only appoint those as ministers (senior positions in his staff) whom he has examined well for their history of virtue, dispositions, activity and whether they give others their due.

Vidura Niti also includes a few hundred verses with suggestions for personal development and the characteristics of a wise person. For example, in Chapter 33, Vidura suggests a wise person refrains from anger, exultation, pride, shame, stupefaction and vanity. He has reverence and faith, he is unhampered in his endeavors by either adversity or prosperity. He believes virtue and profit can go together, exerts and acts to the best of his ability, disregards nothing. He understands quickly, listens carefully, acts with purpose. He does not grieve for what is lost, and does not lose his sense during crisis. He is constantly learning, he seeks enlightenment from everything he experiences. He acts after deciding, and decides after thinking. He neither behaves with arrogance, nor with excessive humility. He never speaks ill of others, nor praises himself. He does not exult in honours to himself, nor grieves at insults; he is not agitated by what others do to him just like a calm lake near river Ganges.

Theory of envoys
J. A. B. van Buitenen, and others, have referred to parts of Udyoga Parva, along with Book 12 of Mahabharata and non-Epic works such as Arthashastra, as a treatise on diplomats and envoys (called dūta, Sanskrit: दूत) involved in negotiations between parties. Broadly, the Parva recognizes four types of envoys—Samdisțārtha are envoys who convey a message but do not have any discretion to negotiate; Parimițārtha are envoys who are granted a circumscribed purpose with some flexibility on wording; Nisrșțārtha are envoys with an overall goal and significant discretion to adapt the details of negotiations to the circumstances; finally, Dūtapranidhi, a full ambassador who has full confidence of the party he represents, understands the interests and Dharma (law, morals, duties) of both parties, and can decide the goal as well as style of negotiations (Krishna acts as such an ambassador in Bhagavat-yana sub-parva of Udyoga Parva).

Udyoga Parva outlines the four methods of negotiations recommended for envoys who are dūtapranidhi: conciliation for the cause of peace and Dharma (sāman), praise your side while dividing the opposition by describing consequences of success and consequences of failure to reach a deal (bheda), bargain with gifts and concessions (dāna), bargain with threats of punishment (daņda). Beyond describing the types of diplomats, Udyoga Parva also lists how the envoy and messengers for negotiations should be selected, the safety and rights of envoys that must be respected by the receiving party regardless of how unpleasant or pleasant the message is. Envoys must be honest, truthful and direct without fear, that they serve not only the cause of king who sends them, but the cause of dharma (law), peace and truth.

Quotations and teachings

Sainyodyoga Parva, Chapter 3:

Sanjayayana Parva, Chapter 25:

Sanjayayana Parva, Chapter 27:

Sanjayayana Parva, Chapter 29:

Prajagara Parva, Chapter 33:

Prajagara Parva, Chapter 33:

Prajagara Parva, Chapter 34:

Prajagara Parva, Chapter 34:

Prajagara Parva, Chapter 34:

Sanat-Sujata Parva, Chapter 42:

Sanat-Sujata Parva, Chapter 43:

Sanat-Sujata Parva, Chapter 44:

See also
 Previous book of Mahabharata: Virata Parva
 Next book of Mahabharata: Bhishma Parva

References

External links
 Kisari Mohan Ganguli, Udyoga Parva The Mahabharata, Translation in English (1886)
 Manmatha Nath Dutt, Udyoga Parva The Mahabharata, Translation in English (1896)
 J. A. B. van Buitenen, 
 Udyoga Parva in Sanskrit by Vyasadeva and commentary by Nilakantha (Editor: Kinjawadekar, 1929)
 Tamil Mahabharatham
 H. Fauche, Le Mahabharata, Translation in French (Paris, 1868)

Parvas in Mahabharata